Kit Bond (born 1939) was a U.S. Senator from Missouri from 1987 to 2011. Senator Bond may also refer to:

Dick Bond (Kansas politician) (born 1936), Kansas State Senate
Julian Bond (1940–2015), Georgia State Senate
Michael Bond (American politician) (fl. 1990s–2010s), Illinois State Senate
Thomas Hinckley Bond (1804–1882), New York State Senate and Connecticut State Senate
William West Bond (1884–1975), Tennessee State Senate